Penwortham Castle was built on the south bank of the River Ribble, at Penwortham to the west of Preston, Lancashire, England, at . The site is a Scheduled Ancient Monument, although only the mound remains.

It was built shortly after the Norman conquest as a motte castle by Roger of Poitou. It served to guard the estuary of the river and a ford crossing it. It was recorded in the Domesday Book in 1086 as having attached to it: six burgesses, three 'radmen' (riding men), eight villeins and four neatherds (cattle keepers). When Roger built Lancaster Castle, Penwortham declined in importance.

In the early 13th century Randolph de Blundeville, Earl of Chester and baron of Lancaster, held his courts in the castle, but soon after the castle fell into disrepair.

See also

Scheduled monuments in Lancashire

References

Fry, Plantagenet Somerset, The David & Charles Book of Castles, David & Charles, 1980. 
Gooderson, P J, A History of Lancashire, Batsford, 1980. 

Castles in Lancashire
Buildings and structures in South Ribble
Scheduled monuments in Lancashire